Everett Klipp (1926–2011) was known as the "Babe Ruth" of the Chicago Board of Trade, (CBOT) and a mentor to Frank Peard, John Horner, Mark Spitznagel and countless other floor traders. After a hardscrabble childhood and adolescence on a dairy farm, he enlisted in the Navy and served in the Pacific Theater during World War II. Following the war, Klipp found work as a messenger for a member firm at the CBOT. He advanced rapidly and bought a seat on the CBOT in 1953, eventually founding Alpha Futures, which became a major firm at the exchange. Especially to the traders he trained, Klipp emphasized the importance of knowing how to take a loss, and the necessity of abandoning a losing position before it became a disaster.

References

Sources

Out of the Pits Traders and Technology from Chicago to London, Univ of Chicago Press, 2006 (paperback 2010)

Further reading

Eek, Everett E. Klipp, Adams Press, 1995 (autobiography)

1926 births
2011 deaths